Ruth Usoro (born 8 October 1997) is a Nigerian athlete who competes at long jump and triple jump.

A student at Texas Tech University, on 26 February 2021 Usoro jumped 6.82m in the long jump to meet the qualifying standard for the delayed 2020 Olympic Games in Tokyo. It was the 2nd best jump in the world for the season at the time and the 3rd best on the Nigerian all-time list alongside Ese Brume.

On 12 June 2021, she jumped 14.19m to win the triple jump at the 2021 NCAA Division I Outdoor Track and Field Championships at Hayward Field, Eugene, Oregon. She also won the NCAA indoor title in 2021. Her personal best triple jump of 14.50 in Texas met the qualifying standard for the delayed 2020 Tokyo Olympics in the triple jump and placed her in the top 10 in the world for the year. Despite arriving in Tokyo to compete at the Olympic Games, Usoro was ruled out when her name was included on a list of ten athletes from her country ineligible to participate due to non-compliance with out-of-competition drug testing requirements in the run-up to the Games. In a statement The Athletics Federation of Nigeria (AFN) took responsibility for the failings and for not putting in place "appropriate measures to comply with rule 15 of the anti-doping rules of World Athletics".

References

External links
 Texas Tech Red Raiders bio

1997 births
Living people
Nigerian female long jumpers
Nigerian female triple jumpers
Texas Tech Red Raiders women's track and field athletes
South Plains College alumni
20th-century Nigerian women
21st-century Nigerian women